Year 1112 (MCXII) was a leap year starting on Monday (link will display the full calendar) of the Julian calendar.

Events 
 By place 

 Byzantine Empire 
 Spring – Malik Shah, Seljuk ruler of the Sultanate of Rum, begins incursions into Anatolia. He marches on Philadelphia with his army, but is halted by the Byzantines under Gabras, governor of the Theme of Chaldia.

 Levant 
 Spring – Seljuk forces under Toghtekin, Turkic governor of Damascus, intervene at Tyre, and force King Baldwin I of Jerusalem to raise the siege. 
 April 10 – The Crusaders fight their way back to Acre (modern Israel).

 Europe 
 February 3 – Ramon Berenguer III (the Great), count of Barcelona, obtains the county of Provence, due to his marriage to the heiress, Douce I. Ramon's dominion stretches as far east as Nice (modern France). 
 May 22 – Henry, count of Portugal, dies from wounds received during a siege at Astorga. He is succeeded by his 3-year-old son Afonso I, but his mother Theresa would rule Portugal alone and becomes regent.
 Duke Bolesław III (Wrymouth) of Poland has his half-brother Zbigniew blinded and thrown into a dungeon in Tyniec Abbey. Archishop Martin I excommunicates Bolesław for committing this terrible crime.
 Otto (the Rich), count of Ballenstedt, is appointed duke of Saxony by Emperor Henry V, but is later stripped of his title.
 Salzwedel in the Altmark (modern Germany) is founded.
 The Margraviate of Baden is founded by Herman II.

 By topic 

 Literature 
 Gallus Anonymus, Polish chronicler and historian, begins to write Gesta principum Polonorum, to Bolesław III.

 Religion 
 Easter – The citizens of Laon in France, having proclaimed a commune, murder Bishop Waldric in his cathedral.

Births 
 García IV (the Restorer), king of Navarre (d. 1150)
 February 3 – Abu Ishaq Ibrahim ibn Ahmad al-Mustazhir, was the son of Abbasid caliph al-Mustazhir and Ismah.
 Henry II (Jasomirgott), duke of Austria (d. 1177)
 Henry IV (the Blind), count of Luxembourg (d. 1196)
 Mahaut of Albon, countess of Savoy (d. 1148)
 Sasaki Hideyoshi, Japanese samurai (d. 1184)
 Sibylla of Anjou, countess of Flanders (d. 1165)

Deaths 
 May 13 – Ulric II (or Udalrich), Italian nobleman
 October 5 – Sigebert of Gembloux, French chronicler
 October 12 – Kogh Vasil (the Robber), Armenian ruler
 November 3 – Anna Vsevolodovna, Kievan princess 
 Baldric of Noyon, bishop of Tournai (b. 1099)
 Bertrand of Tripoli, count of Toulouse and Tripoli
 Elimar I (or Egilmar), count of Oldenburg (b. 1040)
 Fakhr-un-Nisa, Arab scholar and calligrapher
 George II (or Giorgi), king of Georgia (b. 1054)
 Ghibbelin (or Gibelin), archbishop of Arles 
 Henry (or Henri), count of Portugal (b. 1066)
 Kyansittha, king of the Pagan Empire (or 1113)
 Su Zhe, Chinese politician and historian (b. 1039)
 Tancred, Italo-Norman nobleman (b. 1075)
 Vukan I, Grand Prince of Serbia (b. 1050)
 Waldric, English Lord Chancellor (b. 1050)

See also
 List of state leaders in 1112

References